Swire Group is a Hong Kong- and London-based British conglomerate. Many of its core businesses can be found within the Asia Pacific region, where traditionally Swire's operations have centred on Hong Kong and mainland China. Within Asia, Swire's activities come under the group's publicly quoted arm, Swire Pacific Limited. Elsewhere in the world, many businesses are held directly by the parent company, John Swire & Sons Limited, in Australia, Papua New Guinea, East Africa, Sri Lanka, the US and UK. Swire controls a large property empire in Asia – mainly Hong Kong. The current chairman is Barnaby Swire. Taikoo meaning Archean, is the Chinese name of Swire. It serves as the brand name for businesses such as Taikoo Sugar and Taikoo Shing.

History
The Swire Group's privately owned parent company is London-based John Swire & Sons Limited. The Swire Group, started by John Swire (1787–1847) in 1816, had its beginnings as a modest Liverpool import-export company based mainly on the textile trade. John Swire's sons, John Samuel (1825–1898) and William Hudson (1830–1884) took the firm overseas and it was John Samuel Swire in particular whose entrepreneurial instincts would be at the root of the firm's successes in years to come. In 1861, John Swire & Sons Limited began to trade with China through agents Augustine Heard & Co. In 1866, in partnership with R.S. Butterfield, Butterfield & Swire was established in Shanghai. Four years later, a Hong Kong branch of Butterfield & Swire was also opened.

Four years after the establishment of the People's Republic of China, Butterfield & Swire closed all of its China offices. In 1974, Butterfield & Swire in Hong Kong was renamed John Swire & Sons (H.K.) Ltd.

Businesses 

The Swire Group's core businesses in Hong Kong are held by Swire Pacific Limited, listed on the Hong Kong Stock Exchange. The Group's businesses are arranged into groups: property, aviation, beverages and food chain, marine services, and trading and industrial.

Cathay Pacific Airways Ltd. (CPA) 

In 1948, Swire Pacific acquired Cathay Pacific, Hong Kong's largest airline, and remains as the largest shareholder, with 42%.

Swire Properties 

Incorporated in 1972, Swire Properties develops and manages commercial, retail and residential properties, with a particular focus on mixed-use development in prime locations at major mass transportation intersections. The Company's investment portfolio in Hong Kong totals approximately 17.8 million sq ft (approximately 1.66 million square metres) of gross floor area, with Pacific Place, Island East as its core holdings. In addition to Hong Kong, the Company has a presence in China, the United States and the United Kingdom. In China, Swire Properties has a portfolio amounting to approximately 12.9 million sq ft (approximately 1.20 million square metres), the majority of which is under construction. The five projects consist of mixed-use developments in Beijing, Shanghai, Guangzhou and Chengdu, with Sanlitun Village and The Opposite House hotel in Beijing being the best-known among them. In 2008, the Company formed Swire Hotels to create and manage urban hotels in Hong Kong, China and the United Kingdom.

Swire owns a majority of Steamships Trading Company Limited, a Papua New Guinea transport, hotel and property company.

Swire Pacific Offshore Holdings Limited (SPO) 

Swire Pacific Offshore Holdings Limited (SPO), a wholly owned subsidiary of Swire Pacific, supplies chartered vessels that support the offshore oil and gas industry worldwide. It owns a fleet of 69 offshore vessels.

Tidewater entered into a definitive agreement to acquire all of the outstanding shares of Swire Pacific Offshore (SPO), a subsidiary of Swire Pacific Limited, for approximately $190 million in early March 2022. Tidewater announced the completion of its acquisition of Swire Pacific Offshore on Friday 22 April 2022.

The China Navigation Company 

The China Navigation Company is the deep-sea shipping arm of John Swire & Sons Ltd.

John Swire and Sons (Green Investments) Ltd 

John Swire & Sons (Green Investments) Ltd has acquired Scottish biodiesel producer Argent Energy. Argent Energy pioneered large scale commercial biodiesel production in the UK when it started production at its plant near Motherwell in Scotland in 2005. The firm makes its road fuel by recycling wastes and residues from other industries – specifically used cooking oil which is a waste from the food industry, tallow from the meat industry, and sewer grease.

The acquisition in 2013 for an undisclosed sum sees the firm remain in private ownership and it will continue to operate independently. It employs 300 people. As of 2018, Argent Energy has expanded into Ellesmere Port, UK with a Biodiesel Refinery, Pre-Treatment Plant and Oil Terminal. Argent Energy also acquired a Biodiesel Refinery in Amsterdam in November 2018.

Swire Energy Services 

Established in 1979, Swire Energy Services is the world's largest supplier of specialist offshore cargo carrying units to the global energy industry and is a leading supplier of modular systems, offshore aviation services and fluid management.

Coca-Cola bottling licence 

Swire is an anchor bottler in the Coca-Cola System. It is the bottler of Coca-Cola and its related products in Hong Kong, Taiwan and most of China, as well as parts of 13 states in the United States, mainly the mountain west region. This territory represents a population of 420 million people.

In October 2011, Swire Beverages exercised its monopoly to increase the price of Coca-Cola when it was found that the 759 Store, a Hong Kong chain store selling groceries, was selling below its suggested retail price.

Chairmen

Chairmen of Swire Group (John Swire & Sons) 
John Swire, 1816–1847 (Senior Partner)
John Samuel Swire, 1847–1898 (Senior Partner)
 James Henry Scott, 1898–1912 (Senior Partner; Scott's family business Scotts Shipbuilding and Engineering Company was acquired by Swire)
 John Jack Swire, 1912–1927 (Senior Partner until 1914 and chairman thereafter)
Warren Swire, 1927–1946
John Kidston Swire, 1946–1966
Sir John Anthony Swire, 1966–1987
Sir Adrian Swire, 1987–1997
 Edward Scott, 1997–2002
Sir Adrian Swire, 2002–2004
James Hughes-Hallett, 2005–2015 (First non-Swire or Scott family chairman)
Barnaby Swire, 2015–present

Chairmen of Swire Pacific 
Swire Pacific was formed in 1974 (from Taikoo Swire) to become the main holding company for Swire's Hong Kong-based assets.

 John Bremridge, 1974–1980
 Duncan Bluck, 1981–1984
 Michael Miles, 1984–1988
 David Gledhill, 1988–1992
 Peter Sutch, 1992–1999
 James Hughes-Hallett, 1999–2004 
 David Turnbull, 2005–2006 
Christopher Pratt, 2006–2014 
 John Slosar, 2014–2018 (First non-British citizen as chairman)
 Merlin Swire, 2018–2021 (First Swire family chairman)
Guy Bradley, 2021–

See also

 List of bottling companies
 List of oilfield service companies

Notes

References

External links

 
Companies established in 1816
Conglomerate companies of Hong Kong
Conglomerate companies of the United Kingdom
Companies listed on the Hong Kong Stock Exchange
Companies formerly listed on the London Stock Exchange
Multinational companies headquartered in Hong Kong
History of foreign trade in China
Former companies in the Hang Seng Index
Conglomerate companies of China
British companies established in 1816
Swire family
oneworld
Trading companies of China
Trading companies established in the 19th century

sah:Swire Group